.sm is the Internet country code top-level domain (ccTLD) for San Marino.

The domain is occasionally used as a domain hack for sites ending in the -ism suffix.

External links
 San Marino Registration Authority
 IANA .sm whois information

Country code top-level domains
Communications in San Marino

sv:Toppdomän#S